61 Leonis is a possible binary star system in the zodiac constellation of Leo. It is faintly visible to the naked eye, having an apparent visual magnitude of 4.73. The star is moving closer to the Sun with a heliocentric radial velocity of −12.7 km/s.

This is an evolved red giant star with a stellar classification of M0 III that Eggen (1992) listed as being on the asymptotic giant branch (AGB). It is a marginal barium star, showing an enhanced abundance of s-process elements in its outer atmosphere. This material may have been acquired during a previous mass transfer from a now white dwarf companion, or self-enriched by a dredge-up during the AGB process.

61 Leonis is a suspected variable star with apparent magnitude changing between 4.69 and 4.79. The variability was reported in a 1966 photometric survey, but has not been confirmed by more recent photometry.

References

M-type giants
Suspected variables
Barium stars
Leo (constellation)
Leo, p2
Durchmusterung objects
Leonis, 61
095578
053907
4299